Lee Ki-Joo (Hangul: 이기주, Hanja: 李錡柱, 12 November 1926 – 9 December 1996) was a South Korean football forward who played for the South Korea in the 1954 FIFA World Cup. He also played for Busan University.

References

External links
FIFA profile

1926 births
1996 deaths
South Korean footballers
South Korea international footballers
Association football forwards
1954 FIFA World Cup players